Alsophila may refer to:
 Alsophila (moth), a genus of moth
 Alsophila (plant), a genus of tree ferns